Vilanova de Sau is a town in the comarca of the Osona in Catalonia, eastern Spain. It is situated in the valley called Sau. The Ter river runs through the valley, now dammed into Pantà de Sau, a reservoir which is in the municipal territory of Vilanova de Sau, and is a tourist attraction and base for water sports and hiking. The reservoir houses the submerged Church of Sant Romà.

The municipality is linked to Vic and the C-25 (Eix transversal, Girona-Lleida) by the N-141 road.

References

 Panareda Clopés, Josep Maria; Rios Calvet, Jaume; Rabella Vives, Josep Maria (1989). Guia de Catalunya, Barcelona: Caixa de Catalunya.  (Spanish).  (Catalan).

External links

Official website 
 Government data pages 

Municipalities in Osona